Henry Clinton, 7th Earl of Lincoln,  (16847 September 1728), was the elder surviving son of Francis Clinton, 6th Earl of Lincoln and his second wife Susan Penyston (died 1720), younger daughter of Rev Anthony Penyston (son of Sir Thomas Penyston). He succeeded as Earl of Lincoln upon his father's death in 1693, taking his seat in the House of Lords in 1708.

As the brother-in-law of a prominent politician (Newcastle), he served in several offices of state during his lifetime. In 1719 he was one of the main subscribers in the Royal Academy of Music (1719), a corporation that produced baroque opera on stage. From 1715 to 1720, he served as Paymaster of the Forces. Three years later, he was appointed Lord Lieutenant of the Tower Hamlets and Constable of the Tower of London, a prestigious position. He was then elected as a bailiff of the Bedford Level Corporation in 1724, and appointed Lord Lieutenant of Cambridgeshire in 1728, serving until his death later that year.

In 1725, the refusal of Lord Pulteney to follow Walpole's instructions led to Pulteney's dismissal as Cofferer of the Household. Lord Lincoln was then appointed in his place as well as being sworn ex officio of the Privy Council and, following his father, was a Sword Bearer at the coronation of King George II in 1727.

Family
On 16 May 1717, Lord Lincoln married the Hon. Lucy Pelham, a daughter of Thomas Pelham, 1st Baron Pelham, and they had two children:

George Clinton, 8th Earl of Lincoln (1718–1730), previously styled by courtesy, Lord Fynes
Henry Fiennes Pelham-Clinton, 2nd Duke of Newcastle and 9th Earl of Lincoln (1720–1794)

His sons George and Henry succeeded him in turn, the latter inheriting, by special remainder, the title of 2nd Duke of Newcastle (-under-Lyme) from his uncle Thomas Pelham-Holles, 1st Duke of Newcastle (both -on-Tyne and -under-Lyme).

A cousin was General Sir Henry Clinton of the American Revolutionary War.

See also
Earl of Lincoln
Knight of the Garter

References

1684 births
1728 deaths
17th-century English nobility
18th-century English nobility
Henry
Henry
Knights of the Garter
Lord-Lieutenants of Cambridgeshire
Lord-Lieutenants of the Tower Hamlets
Members of the Privy Council of Great Britain
Paymasters of the Forces